Runaway production is a term used by the American Hollywood industry to describe filmmaking and television productions that are intended for initial release/exhibition or television broadcast in the U.S., but are actually filmed outside of the immediate Los Angeles area (including Hollywood), whether in another country, another U.S. state, or in another part of California.

In a 2005 production report by the Center for Entertainment Industry Data and Research (CEIDR), the trend of runaway productions is more frequently linked to American films and television being lured away from U.S. locations to out-of-country locations. A large reason for these productions leaving are foreign subsidies offered to American companies ultimately reducing the cost of making the film. According to the CEIDR report, "The analysis reveals that, while there are certainly general economic factors at play, such as relative labor and exchange rates, the data over the past several years strongly suggests that proliferation of production subsidies around the globe has been one of the most significant factors affecting the choice of production venues for a significant volume of production."

The report further states that "the connection between the advent of Canadian Production subsidies in late 1998 and the dramatic increase in production that occurred in the following year (as reflected by the 144% increase in dollar volume for the 2000 release year films) appears unassailable as there were no appreciable changes in exchange rates or labor rates to justify this dramatic shift from one year to the next, other than the subsidy programs".

Hollywood
Los Angeles has traditionally played a large role in the history of the film industry, both in the US and internationally. The first American film production companies emerged in New Jersey and New York. The relatively poor quality of early recording media and lighting systems meant that films had to be shot in sunlit glass studios. In turn, the weather typical of the northeast states frequently hampered production. Eventually, a trend developed towards using the west and midwest US as ideal locations for shooting.

During the early 1910s, Los Angeles was an advantageous location for filmmakers. It had clear, dry weather that "permitted outdoor filming for much of the year. In addition, southern California offered a variety of landscapes, including ocean, desert, mountain, forest, and hillside"

Camille Johnson-Yale has argued that from a semantics perspective, the term "runaway production" (and the discourse surrounding it) arises from an implicit interpretation of Hollywood as "the authentic home to global film production, and all others as its inauthentic, even criminal, harborers."

"Creative" and "economic" runaways

A report commissioned by the Directors Guild of America (DGA) defined two classes of runaway productions. "Creative runaways" are film and television projects that are produced, in part or in whole, outside the United States based on requirements of the script, setting, or due to preferences of the actors or director. Alternatively, "economic runaways" are productions made in other countries to "reduce costs." This type of production typically involves films that are set (written to be shot) in the United States but which instead have been outsourced to other countries such as Canada, Australia, Fiji, Germany, Hungary, Ireland, New Zealand, South Africa, or the United Kingdom.

Since economic runaways can be caused by a variety of factors, more recent scholarly research has further refined the definition.  In general, there are three different categories of runaway productions (1) artificial economic runaways,(2) natural economic runaways, and (3) artistic runaways.  Artificial economic runaways are films shot abroad or in another domestic locale or jurisdiction because of artificial, or legislatively created, incentives designed to lure productions.  Natural economic runaways are films that shoot in a location to take advantage of natural economic occurring phenomenon—like cheap labor—that lower production costs.  Artistic runaways are films that shoot abroad to artistically service the story – a film about Paris that shoots in Paris.

Motives may be mixed: for example, Francoist Spain kept foreign exchange controls from the Spanish Civil War to the 1970s. 
Filming in Spain was the only way for American producers to indirectly recover the box-office profits from local cinemas exhibiting American films.
Cheap labor, increasingly skilled, and varied landscapes also contributed to bring to Spanish locations super-productions such as Alexander the Great (1956), The Pride and the Passion (1957), Solomon and Sheba (1959).
Producer Samuel Bronston established himself in Spain to link American producers and Spanish talent and authorities.
Patton (1970) also benefited of Spanish soldiers playing Americans and Germans in battle scenes and WWII equipment made available by the Spanish army.

According to CEIDR, Canada receives 90% of U.S. runaway productions, and offers the bulk of the government subsidies.  A subsidy is defined as financial contributions or kickbacks where "government revenue that is otherwise due is foregone or not collected", according to GATT – General Agreement on Tariffs and Trade.

Effect of Canadian subsidies on employment in the US
According to a 2001 U.S. Department of Commerce report by Commerce Secretary, Norman Mineta, "Runaway film production' has affected thousands of (U.S.) workers in industries ranging from computer graphic to construction workers and caterers. These losses threaten to disrupt important parts of a vital American industry."

The U.S. film industry has voiced concerns about this outsourcing trend which began in the mid to late 1990s, and which coincided with increased Canadian government subsidy programs.

A DGA-funded study confirmed that the Canadian government has engaged in a comprehensive and aggressive, long-term strategic campaign to lure U.S. productions to Canada. The report estimates that runaway productions cost the United States over 50,000 jobs and at least US$10 billion in production monies annually.

At least $13 billion is doled out annually in corporate welfare to the business sector in combined Canadian federal and provincial subsidies and tax breaks, according to the Canadian Taxpayers Federation (CTF), a conservative tax watchdog. The CTF released a report saying that from 1982 to 1997, the Canadian federal government handed out $11 billion in 32,969 grants and loans to the provinces earmarked as business subsidies or directly to corporations.

Measuring employment in the U.S. motion picture industry
In 1992, the MPAA claimed 164,000 Californians were directly employed in entertainment production, rising to 226,000 in 1996. Furthermore, in 1996, the estimated number of California jobs indirectly generated by the entertainment industry ranged from 233,000 to 253,100, which brought the "industry's total employment to well over 450,000." The MPAA claimed that entertainment production in California during 1996 generated $27.5 billion in economic activity for the state. The astonishing economic growth from 1992 to 1996, according to the MPAA, exploded for two reasons: (1) as the growth of multiplex theaters and cable television rose, it created a higher general demand for more entertainment media productions; and (2) "the possibility that this new production activity would occur outside California, or in other countries, did not materialize."

In 2004, the MPAA reported employment numbers for the entire United States.  The employment numbers were broken into three categories: production and services (P&S), theaters and video tape rental, and other. In 1995, the total number of Americans employed in the motion picture industry was 283,700 (135,200 in P&S); in 1997, total employment was 323,000 (159,600 P&S); in 2000, total employment was 351,600 (182,100 P&S) and; in 2004, total employment was 367,900 (198,300 P&S).   Hence, in 1997, according to the MPAA 2004 report, total U.S. motion picture employment of 323,000 represents a huge discrepancy from the MPAA's earlier claim that, in 1996, the industry employed over 450,000 workers in California alone.  Adding to the confusion, The Commerce Report—which used the same BLS data cited by the MPAA—claimed 236,152 workers were employed nationwide in motion picture production and allied services in 1997.

In August 2005, the Los Angeles Economic Development Corporation (LAEDC) released a report commissioned by the California Film Commission on the economic impact of runaway productions.  The report compared motion picture employment numbers gathered from the MPAA and the United States Census for the same year, 2002.  The data from the MPAA and the Census was divided into two categories: (1) overall motion picture employment in the United States and; (2) the amount of motion picture employment in California—how much California captures of the total U.S. figure.   In 2002, the Census reported that 153,000 people worked in the motion picture industry in the United States and, of that amount, 88,500 worked in California.  The MPAA data for 2002 reported 353,076 workers in the motion picture industry in the United States, with 245,900 of those jobs in California.

The MPAA, in 1996, claimed that the film industry employed 750,000 Americans, a number that remained on the MPAA's Web Site in 2008.

Competing subsidies
"Who is representing the interests of taxpayers here?" asked CTF Saskatchewan director David MacLean. "The film industry is playing the Saskatchewan government like a worn-out movie script, drawing them into bidding war with other provinces. It's a race to the bottom where nobody wins except film producers."

When faced with the prospect of a worldwide subsidy war, Ron Haney, executive director of the Directors Guild of Canada is quoted as saying,  "Everybody can compete with tax credits now ... It's absolutely frightening."

According to a study by the Canadian government, productions are beginning to "run away" from Canada as well. Productions are now going to countries that have introduced competing and/or counter-incentives and/or subsidies. Many productions are starting to return to the United States due to recent legislation to counteract runaway production.

While film and television employment attributed to foreign location spending and actual spending levels by such productions increased in 2008, the state film incentives enacted in U.S. states showed clear increases in the number of productions shooting in the respective enacting U.S. jurisdiction.

Several Canadian companies are also pulling their support for Canadian Television Fund (CTF) because, "(It) was never intended as a permanent source of funding" to subsidize broadcasters and programmers. One Canadian company stated that, "Our understanding was that after the initial five-year period, the fund would be self-sustaining and self-financing from a return on investment in successful productions."

"The Vancouver Sun's Michael McCullough points out that California not only has the world's highest production costs it also has no tax credits. How do they do it? That's the question BC's film industry should be asking, rather than looking to taxpayers to buck up ... The tit for tat tax credit game is one with only one loser, the taxpayer. There will always be other jurisdictions that will out-subsidize BC. Louisiana offers a straight 20% subsidy for production costs, is that the next industry demand? It is not the job of the government to keep up with incentives but the industry's role to remain competitive."

Other U.S. attempts to end runaway production
The movement of industry jobs to other jurisdictions has led to the formation of non-profit U.S. industry groups, such as the Film and Television Action Committee (FTAC) as well as other groups such as the Directors Guild of America (DGA), SAG-AFTRA (which absorbed the Screen Actors Guild) and others, who have been lobbying state and federal governments to introduce American legislation and counter-incentive programs. Several studies have concluded that foreign government subsidies for film and television production put American film industry workers and companies at an extreme disadvantage.

FTAC believes that foreign government subsidies such as those Canada uses to support its film industry labor are in violation of the WTO rules restricting or prohibiting the use of government subsidies to prop up previously undeveloped industries (such as the Canadian film industry). On September 4, 2007, the FTAC filed a Section 301 complaint with the United States Trade Representative (USTR).  In the petition, the FTAC argued subsidies offered by Canada to lure production and filming of U.S.-produced television shows and motion pictures were inconsistent with Canada's obligations under the WTO. Six weeks later, October 19, 2007, the USTR rejected FTAC's petition.  In a press release, the USTR's office stated:

"As provided under USTR regulations, the petition was reviewed by an interagency committee of trade and economic experts.  Based on a thorough review of the economic data, other facts, and legal arguments set out in the petition, the interagency committee unanimously recommended that the USTR not accept the petition because a dispute based on the information and arguments set out in the petition would not be effective in addressing the Canadian subsidies."

Countervailing efforts in the United States
In recent years, some members of the United States Congress have attempted to counter the runaway production situation with counter-incentives.

The American Jobs Creation Act of 2004 contained provisions allowing U.S. producers of films with budgets under $15 million ($20 million if shot in a low-income neighborhood) to immediately write off their costs in a single year (if 75% of their principal costs are incurred via shooting in the U.S.) It also allows producers to be taxed at a capital gains rate of 15% (rather than at the higher 35% personal income tax rate). Previously producers had to amortize those costs over several years.

Local and state governments have also implemented counter-incentive programs in an effort to encourage domestic film productions to remain in the United States, and the federal government has attempted to rein in outsourcing with legislation to prevent what legislators describe as unfair foreign competition.

See also
Branch plant economy
Cinema of Canada
Cinema of the United States
List of movie-related topics
Movie production incentives in the United States
Offshoring

References

External links
The Creative Coalition – member's advocacy work against runaway production
"The New Rules Project" By Simona Fuma Shapiro Fall 2000 "The Culture Thief"
The Rocord.com – Insider – "Another Twist in ACTRA Strike Drama" (Feb 2, 2007)
2003 – Congressmen Dreier, Berman Re-Introduce Runaway Production Legislation
Reuters – Canada "Court orders arbitration in Canadian actors' strike" Wed Jan 31, 2007
2004 – Governor Schwarzenegger Joins with Other Big State Governors to Push for Federal Incentives Package to fight runaway production
Variety 7/31/2006, 2006(subscription) "Runaway drain? Study: Pic biz in big production pickle"
Los Angeles Times January 22, 2007 "L.A. airports fly high with film shoots" By Tony Barboza, Times Staff Writer

Film and video terminology
Film production
Cinema of the United States
Subsidies
Film genres particular to the United States